GSF Development Driller II is a fifth generation, Vanuatu-flagged dynamic positioning semi-submersible ultra-deepwater drilling rig owned and operated by Transocean.

Development Driller II was deployed in drilling a relief well on the Macondo Prospect to stop the oil spill caused by the explosion and subsequent loss of Deepwater Horizon.

References

External links
Transocean official website
 Development Driller II current position at VesselTracker

2004 ships
Drilling rigs
Semi-submersibles
Ships built in Singapore
Transocean